Against the Grain is an American drama television series that aired on NBC from October 1 until December 24, 1993. starring John Terry, Donna Bullock, Robyn Lively, Ben Affleck, and Vanessa Lee Evigan. The show was inspired by Buzz Bissinger's book Friday Night Lights: A Town, A Team, and a Dream.

Plot
Ed Clemons was an insurance company salesman and former high school football star who became coach of his former team the Stumper Mustangs, located in Stumper, Texas.  Episodes follow the challenges that Ed faces as he attempts to transform a losing team into state champions.

Cast
John Terry as Ed Clemons
Donna Bullock as Maggie Clemons
Ben Affleck as Joe Willie Clemons
Robyn Lively as Jill Clemons
Vanessa Lee Evigan as Jenny Clemons
Stephen Tobolowsky as Niles Hardemann
Jeanine Jackson as Mindy Hardemann
Cheryl Rhoads as Winona Bruhns

Episodes

Reception
Writing in The New York Times, John O'Connor said that "In some respects, the new NBC series Against the Grain does have the courage of its title. It's not just another half-hour sitcom running on wisecracks. It's an hourlong drama admirably aiming, according to one executive producer, Bruce Sallan, to present real-life problems and family issues".

References

External links
 

Television series by Warner Bros. Television Studios
NBC original programming
English-language television shows
Television shows set in Texas
1993 American television series debuts
1993 American television series endings
1990s American drama television series